Mary & Robbs Westwood Cafe is an American restaurant which provides its customers with breakfast and brunch. Mary & Robbs concept focuses on casual dining, with mainstream American dishes such as salads, omelets, French toast, benedicts, burgers etc.

History 

Mary and Robbs was founded in 1950's by couple named Mary & Robbs. The restaurant started as a soda shop counter. In the late 1960s, Mary & Robbs moved to a full service restaurant. The previous owner David Hekmat was dining in the restaurant in July of 1979 for a business meeting, when the owner who knew David’s guest approached him and told him that he wanted to sell the restaurant.

In September 2020, its former owner David Hekmat transferred ownership to Roozbeh Farahanipour. The restaurant is currently owned by Roozbeh Farahanipour.

The restaurant has been frequently ranked among top 10 restaurants in Westwood.

References 

Restaurant chains in the United States
Restaurants established in 1950
Restaurants in Los Angeles